Matthew "Matty" Baldwin (February 15, 1885 – October 15, 1918) was an American boxer from Boston, Massachusetts. Baldwin had 208 fights winning 101 of them.

Baldwin fought Johnny Summers in Massachusetts. Baldwin won by decision. Baldwin fought Harlem Tommy Murphy to a draw in Massachusetts. Baldwin fought Jim Driscoll in two consecutive bouts. Driscoll won both fights by decision; in the Bronx, New York and Boston, Massachusetts. Baldwin fought Harlem Tommy Murphy again in Massachusetts. This time, Murphy won by decision.  Baldwin fought the great Jack Britton in New York City, New York, but lost by decision. At the end of his career he fought Charley White in Boston, Massachusetts, losing by knockout.

References
 
 Biography for Matty Baldwin from BoxRec

Boxers from Massachusetts
1918 deaths
1885 births
American male boxers
Lightweight boxers